Georgios Boustronios (Greek: Τζώρτζης Μπουστρούς, hellenised as Γεώργιος Βουστρώνιος; c. 1435/40 - after 1501) was a 15th century Cypriot royal official and chronicler. His chronicle Διήγησις Kρόνικας Kύπρου (Diegesis Kronikas Kyprou, Narrative of the Chronicle of Cyprus) was written in prose in the Cypriot dialect. He was a close friend and serviceman of James II, the King of Cyprus. His chronicle documents events contemporary to his life, especially the transition from the Lusignan to the Venetian rule in Cyprus. His narrative starts where the chronicle of Leontios Machairas ends, at 1456, and concludes at 1489, the year when Catherine Cornaro, the last queen of Cyprus, ceded the island to the Republic of Venice. He documented the civil war between Charlotte and her half brother James II, between 1440 and 1444, and the interventions by Hospitallers and Mamluks in the politics of the island. He was a relative of Florio Bustron, a notary and the author of another chronicle on Cypriot history, titled Chronique de l'île de Chypre, that begins with antiquity and also ends in 1489.

The chronicle survives in three manuscripts; two are located in the Biblioteca Marciana in Venice and the other one is part of the Arundel Manuscripts located in the British Library, with the Arundel Manuscript considered to be the oldest. The chronicle was first published, based on the two Marcian manuscripts, by Konstantinos Sathas as part of his Medieval Library II (pages 413-543) in Venice in 1873. The chronicle was published again, this time based on all three manuscripts, by Richard M. Dawkins with an English translation as The Chronicle of George Boustronios, 1456-1489 in Melbourne in 1964. In 1997  published another critical edition in the original Greek, titled Τζώρτζης (Μ)πουστρούς (Γεώργιος Βο(σ)τρ(υ)ηνός ή Βουστρώνιος, Διήγησις Κρόνικας Κύπρου. Α more recent publication and English translation was done by Nicholas Coureas in 2006, titled A Narrative of the Chronicle of Cyprus, 1456–1489.

Publications 
Arundel MS 518 16th century manuscript in the British Library.
Διήγησις Kρονίκας Kύπρου Publication by Konstantinos Sathas in his Medieval Library II, Vienna, 1873.

See also 

 Neophytos the Recluse
 Leontios Machairas
 Florio Bustron
 Chronicle of Amadi
 James II of Cyprus
 Charlotte, Queen of Cyprus
 Kingdom of Cyprus
 Venetian Cyprus

References 

Chroniclers
15th-century Greek people
15th-century writers
Cypriot non-fiction writers
Cypriot historians
Eastern Orthodox Christians from Cyprus
People of the Kingdom of Cyprus
15th-century births
16th-century deaths
15th-century Greek writers